This is a list of active separatist movements in Asia. Separatism can include autonomism and secessionism, despite the fact that independence is the primary goal of many separatist movements. Many separatist movements arise as a result of religious, racial, social, and cultural disparities between certain peoples and the majority or ruling class in a country. What constitutes an autonomist or secessionist movement is often debatable; entries on this list must be recognized by credible sources as involved, separatist, and composed of citizens of the country from which independence is sought.

Under each region listed is one or more of the following:
 De facto/proposed state and/or autonomous territory: a proposed term for a secessionist or anticipated sovereign state, or an area seeking greater autonomy.
 Organizations that help: advocacy, cultural, ethnic, ethno-religious, political, regional, and/or religious group(s) that play a significant role in the movement's separatism.
 Government-in-exile: a government that is located outside of the country under consideration, with or without power.
 Recognized individuals who hold key roles within the separatist movement or organization(s)

Militant organization(s) are also classified for movements that establish a de facto state or occupy areas of territory are listed as well.

Afghanistan

Hazarajat

 Ethnic group: Hazara people
 Proposed state:  Hazarajat
 Political party:  Hazarajat Freedom Movement
Balochistan
 Ethnic group: Baloch
 Proposed state: Balochistan  along with Sistan and Baluchestan of Iran and Balochistan of Pakistan.
 Political party: Baloch National Movement, Baloch Republican Party, Free Balochistan Movement (member of the Unrepresented Nations and Peoples Organization)
 Militant organisations: Baloch Liberation Army, Baloch Liberation Front, Baloch Republican Army, United Baloch Army
South Turkestan 
 Ethnic group:  Uyghurs, Tajiks, Uzbeks and Turkic people.
 Proposed state: Southern Turkestan
 Militant organisations:  Turkestan Freedom Tigers

Pashtunistan

 Ethnic group: Pashtuns
 proposed autonomous region: Pashtunistan
 political parties: Hezb-e Islami Gulbuddin and Afghanistan National Front

Azerbaijan 

Territory of the former  Nagorno-Karabakh Autonomous Oblast

 People: Armenians in Azerbaijan
 De facto state:  (recognised by 3 non-UN members)
 Proposed: recognition of Artsakh status based on self-determination principle
 Political organisation: National Assembly
 Military organisation: Artsakh Defense Army

Territory of the short-lived  Talysh-Mughan Autonomous Republic
 People: Talysh people
 Proposed: Talysh province with regional administration within the borders of Azerbaijan
 Political organisation: Talysh National Movement
 Government in exile:  Talysh-Mughan Autonomous Republic

Lezgistan
 Ethnic group: Lezgins
 Proposed: Autonomy or outright independence for  Lezgistan
 Political organisation:  Sadval movement, Federal Lezgian National and Cultural Autonomy

Bangladesh 
 Chittagong Hill Tracts

 Ethnic group: Jumma people
 Proposed: Autonomy for the Chittagong Hill Tracts 
 Political parties: Parbatya Chattagram Jana Samhati Samiti, United People's Democratic Front

Zale'n-gam
 Ethnic group: Kuki
 Proposed state:  Zale'n-gam
 Militant organisation: Kuki National Army
 Advocacy group: Kuki National Organisation

China 

 Xinjiang Uygur Autonomous Region

 Ethnic group: Uyghurs
 Proposed state:  East Turkestan
 Political parties: East Turkistan Government-in-Exile, East Turkistan National Awakening Movement
 Militant organization: Turkistan Islamic Party

 Hong Kong

 Ethnic group: Han Chinese of Hong Kong
 Proposed state:  Hong Kong or unification with 
 Political party: Youngspiration, Hong Kong Indigenous, Hong Kong National Party, Alliance of Resuming British Sovereignty over Hong Kong and Independence and Hong Kong Independence Party

 Inner Mongolia

 Ethnic group: Mongols
 Proposed state:  Inner Mongolia or unification with 
 Political party: Southern Mongolian Democratic Alliance, Inner Mongolian People's Party, Mongolian Liberal Union Party and Southern Mongolian Democratic Alliance

 Macau

 Ethnic group: Han Chinese of Macau
 Proposed state:  Macau

 Tibet

 Ethnic group: Tibetan people
 Proposed state:  Tibet (including Qinghai)
 Political party: Government of Tibet in Exile, Tibetan Youth Congress, International Tibet Independence Movement

 Ethnic group: Taiwanese people
 De facto state: 
 Political party: Government of the Republic of China

Minor movements

  Bashu nationalism or Basuria independence movement
  Cantonese nationalism or Cantonia independence movement
  Shanghainese nationalism, Shanghai independence movement
 Hui pan-nationalism or Ningxia, proposed greater autonomy

Cyprus 

The northeastern 1/3 territory of island of Cyprus
 People: Turkish Cypriots
 De facto state:  (recognized only by Turkey)
 Political organization: Government of Northern Cyprus
 Militant organization: Security Forces Command

Georgia 

Autonomous Republic of Abkhazia

 People: Abkhazians
 De facto state:  (recognized by 6 UN members)
 Political organization: Government of Abkhazia
 Militant organization: Abkhazian Armed Forces

Territory of the former South Ossetian Autonomous Oblast

 People: Ossetians
 De facto state:  (recognized by 5 UN members)
 Political organization: Government of South Ossetia
 Militant organization: Armed Forces of South Ossetia

Javakheti
 Ethnic group: Armenians in Samtskhe–Javakheti
 Proposed: Autonomy for the region  Javakhk (Javakheti)
 Political party: United Javakhk Democratic Alliance

India 

Assam

 Proposed state: Assam
 Ethnic group: Assamese
 Militant organizations:  United Liberation Front of Asom,  Muslim United Liberation Tigers of Assam

Nagaland

 Proposed state:  Nagalim
 Ethnic group: Naga people
 Militant organization:  National Socialist Council of Nagaland

Kashmir
 Proposed: secession of Jammu and Kashmir from India or unification with  Pakistan
 Ethnic group: Kashmiri Muslims
 Political organization: All Parties Hurriyat Conference
 Militant organizations:  Lashkar-e-Taiba, Hizbul Mujahideen, Jaish-e-Mohammed

Kamtapur
 Proposed state: Kamtapur
 Ethnic group: Rajbanshi people
 Militant organization:  Kamtapur Liberation Organisation

Manipur
 Proposed state:  Kangleipak
 Ethnic groups: Meitei, Pangal, Naga
 Militant organizations:  United National Liberation Front,  People's Liberation Army of Manipur,  Kangleipak Communist Party, People's Revolutionary Party of Kangleipak, Kanglei Yawol Kanna Lup,  Maoist Communist Party of Manipur

Punjab
 Proposed state:  Khalistan
 Ethnic group: Punjabi Sikhs
 Militant organizations: Babbar Khalsa, Bhindranwale Tiger Force of Khalistan, Khalistan Commando Force,  Khalistan Liberation Force, Khalistan Zindabad Force, ISYF, AISSF, International Sikh Youth Federation, Waris Panjab De.

Meghalaya
 Proposed state: Meghalaya
 Ethnic group: Khasi people, Pnar people
 Militant organization: Hynniewtrep National Liberation Council.  Seng Khasi Movement

Tripura
Proposed state:   Tripura 
Ethnic group: Tripuris
Militant Organisation: National Liberation Front of Tripura (NLFT) 
Advocacy group: Tipraland State Party

Mizoram
Proposed state:  Mizoram
Ethnic group: Mizo 
Political Party: Mizo National Front (MNF) Zoram People's Movement , Hmar People's Convention

Tamil Nadu
Ethnic group:Tamils, Dravidians, Tegulus 
Proposed State:Tamil Nadu   
Advocacy Group: Dravida Munnetra Kazhagam (DMK)
Kukiland
 Proposed state: Zale'n-gam 
 Ethnic group:  Bnei Menashe
 Militant organisation: Kuki National Army
 Advocacy group: Kuki National Organisation

Santhal Pargana
 Proposed state:  Santhal state 
 Ethnic Group: Santhals
 Militant organisation: Birsa Commando Force - BCF

Rabha hasong
 State or extended autonomous area:  Rabha Hasong
 Ethnic group: Rabha people
 Militant organizations: Rabha Jatiya Aikya Manch, Rabha Vipers Army (RVA), Rabha National Liberation Army, Rabha Jatiya Mukti Bahini (RJMB)

Gorkhaland
 Ethnic group: Indian Gorkha
 Proposal: creation of a separate state Gorkhaland within India or outright independence from India often including Nepali Unification.
 Political movement:  Gorkhaland movement
 Political parties:  Gorkha National Liberation Front,  Akhil Bharatiya Gorkha League, Gorkha Janmukti Morcha

Dimasaland
 Ethnic group:  Dimasa People
 Proposed: Dimasaland
 Millitant Organisation:Dimasa National Liberation Army (DNLA)
Tiwa

 Ethnic group:  Tiwa People
 Proposed: Tiwa State
 Militant Organizations:Tiwa Liberation Army (TLA)

Garo Hills
 Ethnic group: Garo people
 Proposed: making the Garo Hills Autonomous District Council into a state of India or outright independence
 Political party: Garo National Council

Bundelkhand
 Ethnic group: Bundelkhandi
 Proposed: making the region of Bundelkhand into a state of India
 Political party: Bundelkhand Mukti Morcha

Indonesia 

Aceh
 Ethnic groups: Acehnese
 Proposed state:  Aceh
 Militant organisation: Free Aceh Movement (negotiated peace with the Indonesian government in 2005, and now it is a civil movement, but the separatism still has supporters)

Riau
 Ethnic group: Riau Malays
 Proposed state:  Riau, unification with 
 Advocacy group: Gerakan Riau Merdeka
Minahasa Peninsula
 Ethnic group: Minahasan
 Proposed state:  North Sulawesi
 Advocacy group: Independent Minahasa Movement (Gerakan Minahasa Merdeka), Greater Minahasa Alliance
Bali

 Ethnic group: Balinese
 Proposed autonomous area or state: Bali
 Advocacy group: Bali government, ForBALI
Yogyakarta
 Ethnic group: Javanese
 Proposed state:  Yogyakarta, Sultanate Of Yogyakarta

Iran 

Khūzestān Province
 Ethnic group: Khuzestani Arab
 Proposed state: Al-Ahwaz 
 Militant organisations: Al-Ahwaz Arab People's Democratic Popular Front, National Liberation Movement of Ahwaz, Ahwaz Arab Renaissance Party, Ahwaz Liberation Organisation, Arab Struggle Movement for the Liberation of Ahwaz
 Advocacy group: Democratic Solidarity Party of Al-Ahwaz (member of the Unrepresented Nations and Peoples Organization)

Iranian Kurdistan
 Ethnic groups: Kurdish
 Proposed state: Commonwealth of East Kurdistan 
 Political parties: Kurdistan Democratic Party of Iran (member of the Unrepresented Nations and Peoples Organization)
 Militant organisations: Party for a Free Life in Kurdistan, Komalah

Iranian Azerbaijan
Ethnic groups: Azerbaijani
 Proposed state: South Azerbaijan 
Advocacy group: South Azerbaijan National Awakening Movement, Azerbaijan National Resistance Organization
Balochistan

 Ethnic group: Baloch
 Proposed state: Balochistan  along with Balochistan, Pakistan And Baloch majority territories in Afghanistan
 Militant organisations: Jundallah (Historical), Jaish ul-Adl (Currently Active)

Lorestan
 ethnic group: Lurs
 proposed autonomous region: Lorestan
 political party: Lorestan Party of Iran

Iraq 

Proposed state:  
 Majority ethnic group: Kurdish
 Current de jure and de facto autonomous region: Iraqi Kurdistan
 Political parties: Kurdistan Independence Movement, Kurdistan Democratic Party of Iraq, Patriotic Union of Kurdistan (members of the Unrepresented Nations and Peoples Organization)
 Military: Peshmerga

Proposed autonomous area: Nineveh Plains 
 Ethnic group: Assyrian, Arab Christians
 Proposed state: 
 Political parties: Assyrian Democratic Movement, Assyrian Universal Alliance (member of the Unrepresented Nations and Peoples Organization), Assyria Liberation Party
 Militant organisation: Nineveh Plain Protection Units
 Advocacy groups: Assyrian General Conference, Assyria Council of Europe
 Proposed autonomous area: Al-Rafidain Autonomous Region
 Ethnic groups: Assyrians, Turkmen, Yazidis
 Political parties: Turkmen Rescue Foundation, Yazidi Independent Supreme Council and the Al-Rafidain Organization

Proposed state: Basra

Current de jure and de facto autonomous region: Basra Governorate
Proposal: Basra has proposed uniting with the other provinces of Dhi Qar and Maysan as an autonomous region or total independence

Proposed state: Sunnistan

 Advocacy group: Sunni Muslims, Ethnic Kurdis
 Proposal: high degree of autonomy within Iraq or total independence 

 Turkmeneli
 Ethnic group: Iraqi Turkmen
 Proposed state:  Turkmeneli
 Political party: Iraqi Turkmen Front (member of the Unrepresented Nations and Peoples Organization)

Sinjar District
 Ethnic group: Yazidi
 Proposed: autonomy for Sinjar region including Sinjar mountain
 Political parties: Yazidi Movement for Reform and Progress, Sinjar Alliance

Israel 

West Bank and the Gaza Strip

 People: Palestinians
 De jure state:  (recognized by 138 UN member states)
 Political organization: Government of Palestine
 Militant organization: Palestinian National Security Forces, Palestine Liberation Army

Japan 

 Hokkaido
 Ethnic group: Ainu
 Proposed state or autonomous region: Republic of Ainu
 Advocacy group: 

 Okinawa

 Ethnic group: Ryukyuan
 Proposed state:  Republic of Ryukyu or Ryukyu Kingdom
 Political parties: Kariyushi Club, formerly 
 Political groups: Ryukyu independence movement
 Note: The supporters of the movement want the Amami Islands in Kagoshima Prefecture, former part of the defunct Ryukyu Kingdom until 1609, to be part of independent Ryukyu.

Laos  
Northern Laos
 Ethnic group: Hmong people
 Proposed state: Federated ChaoFa
 Organization:  Congress of World Hmong People

Lebanon 
 Aramea
 Ethnic group: Arameans
 Proposed state:  Aramea
 Political parties:  Aramea Democratic Organisation

Malaysia 

 Johor
 Ethnic groups: Johoreans (Mainly Malays, Chinese and Indians)
 Proposed state: Johor
 Advocacy group: Johor Independence Association (JIA), Sultan of Johor, Crown Prince of Johor

 Sarawak
 Ethnic groups: Melanau, Dayak (See Demographics of Sarawak)
 Proposed state:  Raj of Sarawak
 Advocacy group: Borneo Heritage Foundation (BHF), Sarawak For Sarawakian Big Team (S4S Big Team), Sarawak Association of People's Aspirations (SAPA), Sarawak Sovereignty Movement, Sabah Sarawak Keluar Malaysia (SSKM), Sarawak Liberation Movement
 Political parties: Parti Bumi Kenyalang

 Sabah
 Ethnic groups: Kadazan-Dusun, Sama-Bajau (See Demographics of Sabah)
 Proposed state: Sabah
 Advocacy group: Borneo Heritage Foundation (BHF), Sabah Sarawak Keluar Malaysia (SSKM)

Myanmar 

 Arakan
 Ethnic group: Rakhine
 Proposed state:  Arakan State
 Advocacy group: Arakan Independence Alliance, Arakan Army (Kachin State), Arakan Army (Kayin State)

 Zo Asia
 Ethnic group: Chin
 Proposed state: Chin State 
 Militant organisation: Chin National Front (member of the Unrepresented Nations and Peoples Organization)

 Kachin
 Ethnic group: Kachin
 Proposed state: Kachin State 
 Political party: Kachin National Organization

 Kawthoolei
 Ethnic group: Karen
 Proposed state: Kawthoolei 
 Militant organisation: Karen National Liberation Army
 Advocacy group: Karen National Union

 Karenni
 Ethnic group: Karenni
 Proposed state: Kayah State 
 Militant organisation: Karenni Army
 Advocacy group: Karenni National Progressive Party (member of the Unrepresented Nations and Peoples Organization)
 Government-in-exile: Karenni Provisional Government

 Kokang
 Ethnic group: Kokang people (ethnic Han Chinese)
 Proposed state:Kokang state 
 Militant organisation: Myanmar National Democratic Alliance Army

 Mon State
 Ethnic group: Mon
 Proposed state: Mon State, Monland  
 Political party: New Mon State Party

 Northern Rakhine State
 Ethnic group: Rohingya
 Proposed state: Rahmanland 
 Militant organisation: Arakan Rohingya Salvation Army
 Advocacy group: Arakan Rohingya National Organisation, Rohingya National Council

 Shan States
 Ethnic group: Shan (member of the Unrepresented Nations and Peoples Organization)
 Proposed state: Shan Republic 
 Political party: Shan Democratic Union
 Militant organisation: Shan State Army
 Advocacy group: Restoration Council of Shan State
 Government in exile: Interim Government of Federated Shan States
Pa - Oh
 Proposed state: Pa'O Self-Administered Zone
 Ethnic Group: Pa - Oh
 Millitant Organisation: Pa-O National Liberation Army

Palaung

 Proposed state:  Pa Laung Self-Administered Zone
 Ethnic Group:Palaung
 Millitant Organisation:  Palaung State Liberation Army

Wa State
 Ethnic group: Wa
 Proposed state: Wa State  
 Political party:  United Wa State Party
 Militant organisation: United Wa State Army

Zale'n-gam
 Ethnic group: Kuki
 Proposed state:  Zale'n-gam
 Militant organisation: Kuki National Army
 Advocacy group: Kuki National Organisation

Zogam
 Ethnic group: Zomi
 Proposed state:  Zogam
 Militant organisation: Zomi Revolutionary Army
Nagaland

 Proposed state:  Nagalim
 Ethnic group: Naga people
 Militant organization:  National Socialist Council of Nagaland

Nepal 

 Kirat Autonomous State
 Ethnic group: Kiratis
 Proposed state: Kirat
 Political party: Kirat Janabadi Workers Party

 Madhesh
 Ethnic group: Madhesi peoples (including Maithils, Bhojpuris and Tharus).
 Proposed state:  Madhesh
 Advocacy group: Alliance for Independent Madhesh
 Militant Group: Janatantrik Terai Mukti Morcha, Madhesh Mukti Tigers (MMT), Tharuwan National Liberation Front (TNLF).

Pakistan 

 Balochistan 

 Ethnic group: Baloch
 Proposed state: Balochistan  along with Sistan and Baluchestan of Iran and some parts of Afghanistan.
 Political party: Baloch National Movement, Baloch Republican Party, Free Balochistan Movement (member of the Unrepresented Nations and Peoples Organization)
 Militant organisations: Baloch Liberation Army, Baloch Liberation Front, Baloch Republican Army, United Baloch Army

 Gilgit-Baltistan and  Azad Kashmir
 Ethnic groups: Balti, Shina, Wakhi, Burusho, Kho
 Proposed state:  Gilgit-Baltistan
 Militant organisations: Gilgit-Baltistan United Movement, Balawaristan National Front

 Sindh

 Ethnic group: Sindhi
 Proposed state: Sindhudesh 
 Political parties: Jeay Sindh Qaumi Mahaz, Jeay Sindh Muttahida Mahaz, Sindh United Party
 Student organization: Jeay Sindh Students' Federation
 Militant organization: Sindhudesh Revolutionary Army

Punjab 

 Ethnic group: Punjabi Sikhs
 Proposed state:  Khalistan
 Militant organisation: Khalistan Commando Force
 political parties: Shiromani Akali Dal (Amritsar), United Sikh Movement

Pashtunistan

 Ethnic group: Pashtuns
 Proposed: independent state or autonomous region of Pashtunistan or unification with  Afghanistan
 Political party: Pashtoons Social Democratic Party
 autonomist political parties: Awami National Party, Pashtunkhwa Milli Awami Party, Qaumi Watan Party
 movement: Pashtun Tahafuz Movement

Jinnahpur
 Ethnic group: Muhajir people
 Proposed autonomous state: Jinnahpur
 Political party:  Muttahida Qaumi Movement – London

southern Punjab
 ethnic group: Saraiki people
 proposed autonomous region: Saraikistan  
 movement: Saraiki Movement

Hazarajat

 ethnic group: Hazaras
 proposed autonomous region: Hazarajat
 political party: Hazara Democratic Party
 movement: Hazara Province Movement

Philippines 

Sulu archipelago and parts of Zamboanga Peninsula
 Ethnic groups:  Moro (Tausūg, Banguingui, Sama-Bajau, Yakan)
 Proposed state/autonomous area:  Bansa Sūg, Sultanate of Sulu 
Advocacy group: Sultanate of Sulu

Cordillera Administrative Region
 Ethnic group: Igorot
 Proposed autonomous area: Cordillera Autonomous Region or Autonomous Region of the Cordillera
 Advocacy group: Autonomy in the Administrative Cordillera Movement,  Cordillera People's Liberation Army, Cordillera Bodong Administration

Other Islamic militants operating in Mindanao which had goals to create an Islamic state in the Philippines such as the Abu Sayyaf, and the Bangsamoro Islamic Freedom Fighters.

Russia

 Siberia or Siberian Federal District
 Ethnic group: Russians,  (Siberian peoples)
Proposed state:  Siberian Republic
 Movement: Siberian regionalism

 Ethnic group: Buryats
 Proposed state: 
 Political party: All-Buryat Association for the Development of Culture

Territory of the  Far Eastern Republic or Far Eastern Federal District

 Ethnic group: Far Easterners
 Proposed federal subject or independent state: Far Eastern Republic
 Organization: Far Eastern Alternative
 Historical Movements:  Far Eastern Republican Party, Far Eastern Elites, Vozrozhdenie ("Resurrection"), Primorsky Partisans (allegedly)

 Sverdlovsk Oblast
People: Russians
Proposed state:  Ural Republic
Geography: Sverdlovsk Oblast, Chelyabinsk Oblast, Kurgan Oblast, Perm Krai, Orenburg Oblast
Advocacy groups: Ural Democratic Foundation, Free Ural
 Evenkia

 People: Evenks
 Group: Association of Indigenous peoples of Evenkia "Arun"

 Tuva
 People: Tuvans
 Proposed state:  Tuva
 Political organisation: Hostug Tuva
 Sakhalin

 People: Russians

 Ust-Orda Buryat Autonomous Okrug

 People: Buryats
 Geography: Ust-Orda Buryat Okrug
 Group: Erhe Movement
 Type of movement: Autonomist
 Representation on the Free Nations of Russia Forum: No
 Years of activity: 2008 – Present

 Sakha or Yakut 

 Proposed: independent Yakutian state.

 Political organisation:  Free Yakutia Movement, which is represented on the Free Nations of Russia Forum.

 Ethnic group: Khanty people and Mansi people
 Proposed state: 
 Advocacy movements: Association to Save Yugra, Khanty Way, Mansi Way, Ob-Ugrian Union, Society for the Survival and Socio-Economic Development of the Mansi People, Ugrian Association, Youth Public Organization, Yugra Restoration
 Koryak Okrug
 Ethnic group: Koryaks
 Proposed federal subject:  Koryak Autonomous Okrug
 Taymyrsky Dolgano-Nenetsky District
 Ethnic groups: Dolgans, Nganasan, Nenets, Russians
 Proposed federal subject: 
  Agin-Buryat Autonomous Okrug
 People: Buryats
 Group: Erhe Movement
 Proposed Autonomus area: Agin-Buryat Autonomous Okrug

 Altai
 People: Altai people

Saudi Arabia 
Najran Province
 Ethnic group: Zaydi Shia Arabs
 Proposed: independence for Najran Province or unification with Yemen
 Militant organization: Ahrar al-Najran

Sri Lanka 

 Ethnic group: Tamil
 Proposed state: 
 Militant organisation: Liberation Tigers of Tamil Eelam
 Political party: Tamil National Alliance
 Advocacy groups: Transnational Government of Tamil Eelam
 Government in exile: Transnational Government of Tamil Eelam

Syria 

De facto autonomous region: 

 Autonomous Administration of North and East Syria (Rojava)
 Larger ethnic groups: Kurds, Arabs, Assyrians
 Smaller ethnic groups: Armenians, Turkmen, Yazidis, Circassians
 Political organisation: Syrian Democratic Council
 Militant organisation: Syrian Democratic Forces

Assyria
 ethnic group: Assyrians
 proposed state: 
 Political parties: Syriac Union Party, Assyrian Democratic Organization
 Militant organisations: Syriac Military Council, Sutoro
 Advocacy groups: Assyria Council of Europe

Taiwan

The  Republic of China (ROC), commonly known as Taiwan, is a state that has diplomatic relations with 14 United Nations member states (as well as the Holy See, an observer).

 Proposed state:  Republic of Taiwan
 Movement: Taiwan independence movement, Taiwanese nationalism
 Note: The Democratic Progressive Party (DPP) has been democratically elected to power in Taiwan four times; in 2000 (until 2004), in 2004 (until 2008), in 2016 (until 2020), and in 2020 (until 2024). Although the DPP has been the nominal ruling party of the Republic of China throughout these four ruling terms, the DPP has been pushing a pro-Taiwan independence agenda, whether tacitly or overtly. Some representatives of the DPP, such as William Lai, argue that Taiwan independence should not even be considered an "independence movement" but is rather the recognition of the reality of the current situation of the Republic of China on Taiwan. Many supporters of Taiwan independence believe that Taiwan, under the formal name of the "Republic of China", is already an independent country from mainland China, under the formal name of the "People's Republic of China". Some groups also exclude the Kinmen and Matsu Islands from their proposal.
 Political parties: Pan-Green Coalition (Democratic Progressive Party, Taiwan Solidarity Union, Taiwan Independence Party), New Power Party, Taiwan Statebuilding Party
 Advocacy groups: Keep Taiwan Free (Taiwanese organisation), World United Formosans for Independence

Taiwanese indigenous peoples
 ethnic group: indigenous people of Taiwan
 proposed: autonomy for the indigenous people of Taiwan
 political party: Taiwan First Nations Party

Tajikistan
 Gorno-Badakhshan

 Ethnic group: Pamiri people
 Proposed: Greater autonomy for  Gorno-Badakhshan
 Defunct Political party: Lali Badakhshan

Thailand 

 Patani

 Ethnic group: Pattani Malays
 Proposed state:   Pattani Darul Makrif,  unification with 
 Militant organisation: Patani United Liberation Organisation, Patani Malays National Revolutionary Front, Runda Kumpulan Kecil, Pattani Islamic Mujahideen Movement, Islamic Liberation Front of Patani

Turkey 

 Northern Kurdistan

 Ethnic group: Kurdish
 Proposed state:  Kurdistan
 Militant organisations: Kurdistan Workers Party (PKK), Group of Communities in Kurdistan (KCK), Kurdistan Freedom Hawks (TAK), Democrat Party of Kurdistan/North (PDK/Bakur), Revolutionary Party of Kurdistan (PŞK), Communist Party of Kurdistan (KKP)

 
 Ethnic group: Assyrian, Arab Christians
 Proposed state: 
 Political parties: Assyrian Democratic Movement, Assyria Liberation Party
 Militant organisations: Nineveh Plain Protection Units, Dwekh Nawsha
 Advocacy groups: Assyrian General Conference, Assyria Council of Europe

Uzbekistan 

 Karakalpakstan
 Ethnic group: Karakalpaks
 Proposed state:  Republic of Karakalpakstan
 Advocacy group: Free Karakalpakstan National Revival Party

Vietnam 

 Khmers Kampuchea-Krom Federation
 Ethnic group: Khmer Krom
 Proposed state: Kampuchea-Krom

 Montagnard Foundation, Inc.
 Ethnic group:  Degar people
 Proposed state:  Montagnard or Degar State

Yemen 

  South Yemen
 Proposed state:  South Arabia,  or  State of Aden
 De facto state: Southern Transitional Council
 Political parties: South Yemen Movement, Yemeni Socialist Party
  Hadhramaut
 Ethnic group: Arab as well as Mehri and Soqotri
 Proposed states:  Kathiri,  Qu'aiti,  Wahidi Balhaf,  Mahra
 De facto state: Hadhramaut Region, Protectorate of South Arabia
 Political party: Hadhrami League

See also 
 Lists of active separatist movements
 List of historical separatist movements
 Autonomous area

References 

Separatist Movements, Active
Separatist Movements in Asia, Active
Asia